Charles Gregory "Bebe" (pronounced ) Rebozo (November 17, 1912 – May 8, 1998) was an American Florida-based banker and businessman who was a friend and confidant of President Richard Nixon.

Early life

The youngest of 12 children (hence, the nickname "Bebe" meaning "Baby" in Spanish) of Cuban immigrants to Tampa, Florida, Matias and Carmen, Rebozo owned several businesses in Florida, including a gas station and a group of laundromats, before he started his own bank, the Key Biscayne Bank & Trust, in Key Biscayne, Florida, in 1964. Rebozo regularly attended Key Biscayne Community Church, sometimes accompanied during later years by Nixon.

Friendship with Richard Nixon

Rebozo first met then-U.S. Representative Nixon in 1950 through Florida Representative George Smathers. Smathers had recommended Key Biscayne as a vacation destination to Nixon, who eventually established a residence there which was later nicknamed the "Winter White House" by journalists. While Nixon was vacationing in Key Biscayne, Smathers had Rebozo take Nixon deep sea fishing. Rebozo and Nixon then started a friendship that endured 44 years.

Rebozo quickly became best friend and financial and real estate advisor to Nixon. In 1968 Rebozo changed his party from Democratic to Republican.

According to Rebozo, the two men were swimming together at Rebozo's home in June 1972 when Nixon was first informed of the Watergate Hotel break-in, and he was with the president on the night that Nixon resolved to resign from the presidency. 
John Dean, Nixon's lawyer, testified before the House Judiciary Committee that he had been ordered to direct government agencies covertly to punish a journalist who called Rebozo "Nixon's bagman." Rebozo was investigated for accepting covert payments of $100,000 on behalf of Nixon.

Journalist Jack Anderson speculated that Watergate Special Prosecutor Archibald Cox had been fired because he had started to investigate Rebozo's role in Nixon's accepting covert payments.

According to a New York Times article dated Nov. 27, 1975, a completed manuscript of a biography on Bebe Rebozo, that was scheduled to be published by Farrar,’ Straus & Giroux was stolen from the home of Thomas Kiernan.  In addition to Rebozo's biography "several tape recordings of interviews and several research files, including one file containing all of Mr. Kiernan's book contracts and another containing all his royalty statements, were taken." Other news coverage at the time pointed out at the time that "thieves ignored" jewelry and other items of value.

Later life and death
Rebozo received a letter threatening his life in 1974.

In 1976, Rebozo was the subject of a bank fraud investigation. The loan application Rebozo filed with Hudson Valley National Bank (Yonkers, New York) stated that the loan was for residential real estate when it was actually used for business. Rebozo repaid the loan with interest, and the bank did not file a complaint.

Rebozo died on May 8, 1998, of complications from a brain aneurysm.

Personal life
Following his graduation from Miami High School, class of 1930, Rebozo married his high school sweetheart, Claire Gunn. Both of them were 18, and the marriage was annulled three years later. In 1946, they remarried but divorced four years later. He later married Jane Lucke, who survived him.

References

Sources
 Fulsom, Don (February 5, 2006). "The Mob's President: Richard Nixon's Secret Ties to the Mafia." Crime Magazine.
 Leinster, Colin (July 31, 1970). "Nixon’s Friend Bebe." Life, vol. 69, no. 5. pp. 18-26.
 Summers, Anthony (2000). The Arrogance of Power: The Secret World of Richard Nixon.

External links
 Charles Gregory “Bebe” Rebozo at Find a Grave
 Charles (Bebe) Rebozo at Spartacus Educational

1912 births
1998 deaths
American bankers
American people of Cuban descent
Florida Republicans
People from Key Biscayne, Florida
Richard Nixon